The Hood River–White Salmon Interstate Bridge, or just the Hood River Bridge, is a truss bridge with a vertical lift that spans the Columbia River between Hood River, Oregon, and White Salmon, Washington. It connects Interstate 84/U.S. Route 30 on the Oregon side with Washington State Route 14.

The bridge is the second oldest existing road bridge across the Columbia River between Washington and Oregon.  It was built by the Oregon-Washington Bridge Company and opened on December 9, 1924.  The original name was the Waucoma Interstate Bridge.

On December 12, 1950, the Port of Hood River purchased the bridge from the Oregon-Washington Bridge Co. for $800,000.

The bridge is operated as a toll bridge by the Port of Hood River.  Currently the tolls are set to $2.00 for a passenger car, with $3.00 for each axle for a truck, and either 75¢ or $1.00 for motorcycles.  Bicycles and pedestrians are prohibited from crossing the bridge due to its lack of sidewalks and narrow width.

20 piers are used to support the total length of 4,418 ft (1347 m).  When closed the vertical waterway clearance is 67 ft (20m).  This increases to 148 ft (45 m) when the bridge is open at a river level of 75', which typically happens once or twice a month.  The horizontal waterway clearance of the lift span is 246 ft (75 m).

The bridge has weight restrictions: 24 tons for legal truck types 3 and SU5, 32 tons for types 3S2 and 3-3, 22 tons for type SU4, and 25 tons for types SU6 and SU7 (descriptions of these truck types can be found here).

It is located at river mile 169, between Bridge of the Gods at RM 148 and The Dalles Bridge at RM 191.

Planned replacement

Plans to replace the existing bridge resulted in a 2003 draft environmental impact statement. A fixed span design concept with wider lanes and a bicycle/pedestrian path that meets modern seismic standards was proposed in 2022. Construction is scheduled to begin in 2025 and be completed in 2029 at a cost of $520 million. Funding for the project would be split between the Oregon and Washington governments as well as federal and local sources.

References

External links
Replacement bridge Full Report  (10MB).
History of the Hood River Bridge 

1924 establishments in Oregon
1924 establishments in Washington (state)
Bridges completed in 1924
Bridges over the Columbia River
Buildings and structures in Hood River, Oregon
Transportation buildings and structures in Klickitat County, Washington
Columbia River Gorge
Road bridges in Oregon
Road bridges in Washington (state)
Toll bridges in Oregon
Toll bridges in Washington (state)
Towers in Washington (state)
Vertical lift bridges in Oregon
Truss bridges in the United States
Metal bridges in the United States
Transportation buildings and structures in Hood River County, Oregon